Lil' Golden Book is the debut album by the New Zealand recording artist Princess Chelsea. It was released on 2 May 2011,  through Lil' Chief Records. The album was produced by Jonathan Bree and Chelsea Nikkel. The album tells the tale of life growing up as a teenager and young adult in New Zealand.

Background
Nikkel stated that the album took nearly three years of production. The booklet features 15 pages designed by bandmate Brad Fafejta. The album is described as 'when cute meets creepy'.

The album was named after Little Golden Books, which are a series of children's books that started in the 1940s and are still being released today. She called her album "Lil' Golden Book" instead of "Little Golden Book" as an attempt to prevent herself from getting sued, but also to pay homage to her record label Lil' Chief.

Critical reception
Lil' Golden Book received mostly positive reviews. The Sunday Star Times named it 'album of the week' and aptly described it as 'when cute meets creepy'. Graham Reid has called it 'mischievous and sharp' and The New Zealand Herald has likened it to "growing pains in the happiest place on earth". Louder Than War said "the quirky 'Monkey Eats Bananas' is a thumping, jungle-beat track that was a huge hit on YouTube." KittySneezes described Nikkel's vocals as "childlike tones" that "evoke the innocence necessary to make the simple lyrics work."

One of the more popular songs from the album is "The Cigarette Duet" with vocals from Jonathan Bree. The video was uploaded to YouTube in early 2011, to date surpassing 50 million views. This led to her being featured on The Guardians 'New Band of the Day'.

Singles
 "Monkey Eats Bananas" was released on 2 June 2009 as a digital download.
 "Machines of Loving Grace" was released on 18 March 2009 as a music video featuring clips from the film The NeverEnding Story.
 "Too Fast to Live" was released on 11 October 2011 as a digital download with B-side "After the Moment", a cover of the Craft Spells song.
 "Ice Reign" was released on 11 April 2011 as a digital download.
 "The Cigarette Duet" was released on 9 June 2011 as a digital download with B-side "Positive Guy Meets Negative Man".
 "Yulia" was released on 18 February 2012 as a music video featuring her cat, Winston.
 "The Cigarette Duet (European Tour Edition)" was released on 14 May 2012 as a digital download and as a pink vinyl including the songs "The Cigarette Duet", "Positive Guy Meets Negative Man", "Goodnight Little Robot Child", and "The Cigarette Duet (Radio Edit)".
 "Overseas" was released on 14 September 2012 as a digital download with B-side "Winston Crying on the Bathroom Floor" which included clips of her cat, Winston, meowing.
 "Frack" was released on 12 December 2012 as a music video.
 "Caution Repetitive" was released on 5 April 2013 as the final music video from the Lil' Golden Book series.

Track listing
All tracks written by Chelsea Nikkel; all tracks produced by Nikkel and Jonathan Bree.

Personnel
Credits adapted from Lil' Golden Book album liner notes.

 Princess Chelsea - vocals (all tracks)

with guests

 Jonathan Bree - Drums, Guitar, Electric Bass, Vocals on 'Cigarette Duet'
 Mahuia Bridgman-Cooper - Violin on 'Too Fast to Live'
 Lance Smith - Harmonica on 'Too Fast to Live'
 James Milne - Vocals on 'Overseas'

Thank you

Jonathan Bree, Jamie-Lee Smith, Brad Fafejta, Scott Mannion, Gareth Shute, Lawence Mikkelsen, Esther Maake, Johnathan Hughes, Stacey Thomas, Leonardo DiCaprio, Edmund Cake, The Brunettes, Pikachunes, Golden Axe, Stevie Kaye, Joseph Harper, Andrew Tidball, The Nikkel Family, Robbie Neilson, Johanna Freeman, Richard Braitigan.

References

2011 debut albums
Lil' Chief Records albums
Princess Chelsea albums